Fortuitous Oddity is a 1996 self-released demo by deathgrind band Cephalic Carnage. In 1997, the band released it again with different artwork.

Track listing 
 "Analytical" – 4:36
 "Chelsea" – 1:55
 "Waiting for the Millennium" – 3:15
 "Withered" – 2:00
 "Hybrid" – 4:28
 "Kill for Weed" – 2:28

Re-recordings 
"Analytical", "Waiting for the Millennium", and "Withered" (renamed "Wither") were re-recorded on Conforming to Abnormality (1998). "Hybrid" was re-recorded on Exploiting Dysfunction (2000). "Kill for Weed" was re-recorded on Anomalies (2005).

External links

Cephalic Carnage albums